Dignitatis humanae (Of the Dignity of the Human Person) is the Second Vatican Council's Declaration on Religious Freedom. In the context of the council's stated intention "to develop the doctrine of recent popes on the inviolable rights of the human person and the constitutional order of society", Dignitatis humanae spells out the church's support for the protection of religious liberty. It set the ground rules by which the church would relate to secular states.

The passage of this measure by a vote of 2,308 to 70 is considered by many to be one of the most significant events of the council. This declaration was promulgated by Pope Paul VI on December 7, 1965.

Dignitatis humanae became one of the key points of dispute between the Vatican and traditionalist Catholic such as Archbishop Marcel Lefebvre who argued that the council document was incompatible with previous authoritatively stated Catholic teaching.

Background

Earlier Catholic view

Historically, the ideal of Catholic political organization was a tightly interwoven structure of the Catholic Church and secular rulers generally known as Christendom, with the Catholic Church having a favoured place in the political structure. In 1520, Pope Leo X in the papal bull Exsurge Domine had censured the proposition "That heretics be burned is against the will of the Spirit" as one of a number of errors that were "either heretical, scandalous, false, offensive to pious ears, or seductive of simple minds and against Catholic truth".

Vatican II and religious freedom

Third session (1964)
The debate on a separate Declaration on Religious Liberty was held on September 23 – September 25, as promised by Pope Paul the year before. However, in October an attempt was made by the Curial party to return this declaration to review by a special commission, which contained many hostile members and was outside the jurisdiction of the Pontifical Council for Promoting Christian Unity. Protest by bishops to Pope Paul resulted in the declaration staying under Unity with a different working commission which reviewed and amended it.

Fourth session (1965)
This re-revised text was approved by the council on October 25, with only minor amendments allowed afterward (including some disliked by Murray). The final vote was taken and the declaration was promulgated at the end of council on December 7, 1965. The claim by some that this overwhelming majority was due to intense lobbying by the reformist wing of Council Fathers among those prelates who initially had reservations or even objections.

Traditionalist Catholic reception
Archbishop Marcel Lefebvre cited this document as one of the fundamental reasons for his difficulties with the Second Vatican Council. It remains a focus for attacks from Traditionalists in the 21st century. The Vatican's position that the SSPX must acknowledge Dignitatis humanae and Nostra aetate as authoritative remained  a key point of difference between the two.

The Society of St. Pius X criticized how Dignitatis humanae approached religious freedom with an argument from history:  

On the contradictions some see between Dignitatis humanae and Pope Pius IX's Syllabus of Errors, Brian Mullady has argued that:

International Theological Commission, 2019
On 21 March 2019, Pope Francis approved the publication of a document produced by the International Theological Commission called "Religious freedom for the good of all: Theological approach to contemporary challenges". It attempts to update Dignitatis humanae in the light of the increasing diversity and secularization seen since the Council: "the cultural complexity of today's civil order".

See also

 Relations between the Catholic Church and the state
 Christian state
 Res publica Christiana
 Quanta cura
 Mirari vos

Notes

References

Further reading

Stüssi, Marcel (2012). Models of Religious Freedom: Switzerland, the United States, and Syria by Analytical, Methodological, and Eclectic Representation, 375 ff.

External links

Holy See: Archive: Documents of the II Vatican Council: Dignitatis humanae (full text in English)

Documents of the Second Vatican Council
Documents of the Catholic Social Teaching tradition
1965 documents
1965 in Christianity